{|
{{Infobox ship image
|Ship image=HMS Benbow (detail) Study of HMS 'Benbow' and other vessels in Portsmouth Harbour, 1826 RMG PZ0910.jpg
|Ship caption=Study of HMS 'Benbow in Portsmouth Harbour, 1826
}}

|}

HMS Benbow was a 74-gun third rate ship of the line of the Royal Navy, built by Brent of Rotherhithe and launched on 3 February 1813.

In 1840 Benbow saw action in the bombardment of the city of Acre under the command of Admiral Robert Stopford. At the height of the battle either Benbow or the naval steamer  fired the shell that destroyed Acre's powder magazine, causing an explosion that greatly weakened the city's defences.Benbow was used for harbour service from February 1848 until August 1859, when she was converted to be used as a coal hulk. In 1892, after 79 years of service, she was sold out of the Navy, and was broken up in 1895 at Castle, Woolwich.

References

Bibliography
 
 
 Lavery, Brian (2003) The Ship of the Line - Volume 1: The development of the battlefleet 1650-1850.'' Conway Maritime Press. .

 

Ships of the line of the Royal Navy
Vengeur-class ships of the line
Ships built in Rotherhithe
Coal hulks
1813 ships